WDS may refer to:

Computing
 Webpack dev server
 Wireless distribution system, a wireless network bridging technology
 Windows Desktop Search, the implementation of Windows Search for Windows XP and Windows Server 2003
 Windows Desktop Sharing, a Microsoft screen-sharing technology
 Windows Deployment Services, a technology from Microsoft for network-based installation of Windows operating systems.
 World Data System, a system for preserving scientific data
 Worldwide Diagnostic System, a service tool for Ford trustmark automobile dealerships worldwide
 Wide-area data services, a feature of StorTrends iTX

Other uses
 Shiyan Wudangshan Airport (IATA code)
 Wavelength-dispersive X-ray spectroscopy, a materials analysis method
 Washington Double Star Catalog, an astronomical publication